Sgt. Petsound's Lonely Hearts Club Band is a track-for-track mash-up of The Beach Boys’ Pet Sounds with The Beatles’ Sgt. Pepper's Lonely Hearts Club Band by Clayton Counts, posted on his blog. It was released under the pseudonym "The Beachles" and received favorable mentions in Entertainment Weekly and USA Today, as well as blogs around the world. Sometime around September 8, 2006, Counts received a cease and desist order from EMI's attorneys. Notably, the letter included a demand for Counts to hand over the IP addresses of everyone who downloaded or streamed the songs. Counts removed the songs, but refused to give up the IPs and fired back with a lengthy missive on his blog. The incident drew the attention of the Associated Press and Rolling Stone, and resulted in a letter-writing campaign and a boycott of EMI and Capitol Records on behalf of Counts.

Counts linked to the tracker site isoHunt as a place to still download the album after his cease and desist letter.

Track listing
 "Wouldn't Sgt. Petsound Be Nice?"
 "You Still Believe in My Friends"
 "That's Not Lucy"
 "Don't Talk (Get Better)"
 "I'm Fixing It, Dayhole"
 "She's Going Away for Awhile"
 "Being for the Benefit of Sloop John B!"
 "God Only Knows What I'd Be Within You"
 "I Know There're Sixty-Four Answers"
 "Today, Rita"
 "I Just Wasn’t Made for Good Mornings"
 "Sgt. Petsound's Lonely Hearts Club Band (Reprieve)"
 "A Day in the Life of Caroline"
 "Runout Groove"

References

External links
Beachles Update, Tiny Mix Tapes' interview with Clayton Counts
Bad Vibrations, CBC article

Mashup albums
The Beatles bootleg recordings
2006 remix albums
The Beatles remix albums
Unofficial remix albums
Musical tributes to the Beach Boys
The Beatles tribute albums
Sampling controversies